Moving out may refer to:

 Relocation (personal), the act of leaving one dwelling and settling in another
 Leaving the nest, a young person moving out of the accommodation provided by their guardian, fosterers or parent

Movin' Out or Moving Out may refer to:
 Movin' Out (musical), a jukebox musical featuring the songs of Billy Joel
 "Movin' Out" (Aerosmith song)
 "Movin' Out (Anthony's Song)", a song by Billy Joel
 "Movin' Out (Brian's Song)", a Family Guy episode
 "Movin' Out" (Glee)
 Moving Out (album), by jazz saxophonist Sonny Rollins
 Moving Out (film)
 Moving Out (video game)
 "Moving Out", the first episode of the British television sitcom So What Now?